384th may refer to:

384th Air Expeditionary Group, provisional United States Air Force unit assigned to the Air Combat Command
384th Air Expeditionary Wing, inactive unit of the United States Air Force
384th Air Refueling Squadron (384 ARS) is part of the 22d Air Refueling Wing at McConnell Air Force Base, Kansas
384th Bombardment Squadron or 134th Fighter Squadron, unit of the Vermont Air National Guard 158th Fighter Wing located at Burlington Air National Guard Base, Vermont
384th Fighter Squadron, inactive United States Air Force unit
384th Infantry Division (Wehrmacht) formed during the winter of 1941/42, as part of the 18th wave

See also
384 (number)
384, the year 384 (CCCLXXXIV) of the Julian calendar
384 BC